Mike France (born October 22, 1962) is an American politician who served in the Connecticut House of Representatives from the 42nd district from 2015 to 2023. He was the 2022 Republican nominee in Connecticut's 2nd congressional district, losing to incumbent Joe Courtney.

References

1962 births
21st-century American politicians
Candidates in the 2022 United States House of Representatives elections
Living people
Republican Party members of the Connecticut House of Representatives
University of Southern California alumni
Naval Postgraduate School alumni
Eastern Connecticut State University alumni
Politicians from Memphis, Tennessee